Cheryl Toh  is an Australian lawyer, television personality, quiz champion and has been one of the six "chasers" on The Chase Australia television quiz show since January 2019.

Toh joined The Chase Australia as one of the six chasers in January 2019, alongside Mark Labbett, Issa Schultz, Brydon Coverdale, Anne Hegerty and Matt Parkinson. In 2020 she appeared as one of the four Australian Chasers on the local version of Chase spin-off Beat The Chasers Australia.

Referred to as "Tiger Mum" on The Chase, Toh has said, "My family likes the nickname. It was either me or my father who first suggested it. Many women, especially in the Asian community, regard it as a compliment to be called a 'tiger mum'. For me, I am having a bit of a laugh at myself."

Prior to The Chase Australia, Toh appeared on The Einstein Factor in 2007 - her special subject was the TV series Agatha Christie's Poirot. 

In 2015, Toh won $75,000 on Million Dollar Minute. She progressed to play for $200,000 but failed to make it to the final game and left with her $75,000 of safety net winnings.

References

External links 

Living people
Contestants on Australian game shows
Australian women lawyers
Australian television personalities
Women television personalities
Quiz championship players
Year of birth missing (living people)
21st-century Australian lawyers